Oedipina gephyra, commonly known as the La Fortuna worm salamander, is a species of salamander in the family Plethodontidae.
It is endemic to Honduras.

Its natural habitat is subtropical or tropical moist montane forests.
It is threatened by habitat loss.

References

G
Amphibians of Honduras
Endemic fauna of Honduras
Endangered fauna of North America
Taxonomy articles created by Polbot
Amphibians described in 1993